Glorieta de la Palma is a roundabout in Mexico City that connects Paseo de la Reforma with Río Rhin Street and Niza Street. It is known for its tall palm tree that remained in the middle for a century. The roundabout is the only one along Reforma that has never had a monument. The building of Bolsa Mexicana de Valores is at the roundabout, opposite the Zona Rosa. The area is serviced by the city's Metrobús system at La Palma station, whose pictogram features the palm tree.

The palm died in 2022 due to pathogens and since June 2022 a Montezuma cypress decorates the traffic circle.

History

The roundabout was included in Louis Bolland and Ferdinand von Rosenzweig's original plan for the boulevard, and finished as Reforma's second roundabout completed in 1865. The Angel of Independence column was constructed in 1910 to celebrate the centenary of Independence and, according to one of the versions, the roundabout could be set aside for the construction of another memorial to mark the bicentennial of Independence in 2010. Up to ten palm trees were eventually planted there, and the earliest known photograph showing the middle tree is from 1920. All but the central palm tree were removed around 1950.

Carlos Martínez Assad, emeritus researcher at the National Autonomous University of Mexico, disputed the age of the palm and considers its real age to be between 70 and 80 years as, according to him, it was a gift from Haile Selassie, the last Emperor of Ethiopia, to Lázaro Cárdenas as compensation for his stand against Italy's occupation during the Second Italo-Ethiopian War. He also said that the traffic circle was reserved for a sculpture of Benito Juárez that was sent instead to Guanajuato.

The palm tree died in 2022 as a result of pathogens and fungi that had infected several palm trees in the city. On 24 April, the government conducted a symbolic farewell ceremony in the late afternoon, and that evening, it was cut down. Its remains were transferred to a vivarium in Xochimilco, where artists would elaborate sculptures with the unaffected wood.

Ahuehuete roundabout

The city government, headed by Claudia Sheinbaum, surveyed to question which tree should replace it, with options including a jacaranda or a Montezuma cypress; however, a palm tree would not be able to do so because it would contract the same pathogens. A Montezuma cypress, also known as an ahuehuete, was chosen in a non-binding poll with more than 77,000 votes, Sheinbaum announced it would be planted on 5 June 2022 (on World Environment Day).

Two days after the tree was planted, a motorist lost control of her car and slammed into the roundabout, severing one of the wires holding the tree up and tipping it over. The tree had a dry appearance for several weeks as a result of the accident and the habitat shift. The tree started to exhibit signs of improvement by the end of July of that year. In September 2022, the city government walled off the traffic circle to bar pedestrian entry because of the recovery slowness. The safety fence was struck by another car the following month. In November 2022, Saúl Alcántara, a specialist in garden conservation at the Universidad Autónoma Metropolitana and who collaborated in the successful transfer of other similar specimens in the city, said that the tree's chance of improvement was minimal. Alcántara attributed the causes of the drying out to incorrect re-planting beyond subsequent events.

The city government announced on 9 March that since the tree did not improve, it would be replaced with a tree of the same species and nursery.

Roundabout of the Disappeared

On 8 May 2022, collectives in search of disappeared people symbolically intervened the empty traffic circle, renamed it and installed the Glorieta de las y los Desaparecidos (Roundabout of the Disappeared) anti-monument. Photos of the missing were posted on the location, just like what occurred at the nearby , which was taken over by feminists. In order to draw attention to the nearly 100,000 instances of missing persons reported in the nation as of May 2022, the collectives installed the pictures. Sheinbaum rejected their initiative because "a group of people cannot be above a vote". The authorities took down the images and banners in the hours that followed. The collectives' representatives claimed that they were not opposed to the Montezuma cypress and that both plans could coexist, but they criticized the government for "disappearing the disappeared" in their statements.

Activists reinstalled the pictures of the missing people a few hours after the Montezuma cypress was planted, they nicknamed the tree El Guardian de los desaparecidos ("The Guardian of the Disappeared") and they asked the officials to officially rename the roundabout the Glorieta de las y los Desaparecidos. In this regard, government representatives have mentioned that they would prefer to intervene the Estela de Luz, a monument also located on the avenue, into a memorial in honor of the missing. Human rights organizations symbolically changed the names of the Hamburgo and Glorieta de Colón stations of the Mexico City Metrobús to "Glorieta de las y los Desaparecidos" and "Glorieta de las Mujeres Que Luchan", respectively on 24 July 2022. The protest symbols were used in lieu of the station pictograms in the signage while maintaining the system's design aesthetic. As a result of the numerous anti-monument memorials situated along the road, Paseo de la Reforma has been symbolically renamed the Ruta de la Memoria (Route of Memory).

The photos were once more taken on 6 November 2022 and Christmas decorations were added to the security fences. The following week, activists repainted the area and urged Andrés Manuel López Obrador, the president of Mexico, to keep his pledge to meet with them to address the disappearances.

Collectives in search of missing persons criticized the planning as a unilateral arbitrary joke and compared the proposal with the Memorial to Victims of Violence in Mexico located meters away from their anti-monument, which they called a "vile and offensive memorial without remembrance". Additionally, they said that if the project went forward, they would intervene in the stelae to create their own memorial.

References

Further reading
 "La Glorieta de las y los Desaparecidos" (in Spanish). Espacios para la Memoria. Heinrich Böll Foundation.

External links

 

1865 establishments in Mexico
2022 in Mexico
Anti-monuments in Mexico
Individual trees in Mexico
Paseo de la Reforma
Roundabouts and traffic circles in Mexico